Nick Sheppard is an English guitarist. He played lead guitar for The Clash from 1983 until the band's breakup in 1986.

Life and career
Sheppard was educated at Bristol Grammar School, one of Bristol's leading public schools, and was in the same year as fellow musician Mark Stewart of The Pop Group. He started at 16 with The Cortinas, named after a well-known British car, the Ford Cortina. The band moved from R&B towards covering songs by punk forerunners like the New York Dolls and The Stooges. "In retrospect, I suppose we were very hip," Sheppard says. "We were listening to the right records, as we were right there at the right time." The Cortinas' singles, "Fascist Dictator" and "Defiant Pose" both appeared on Step Forward, the label run by Police manager Miles Copeland, as did their only album "True Romances". The band split up in September 1978, after which Sheppard played in a number of bands, including The Viceroys and The Spics, a Bristol-based big band.

Sheppard moved to California, then back to Britain. When The Clash sacked Mick Jones in 1983, Sheppard and Vince White replaced him, and he toured America and Europe with them in 1984, playing on their final album Cut the Crap. The album attracted criticism through manager Bernie Rhodes' intrusive production and use of a drum machine. When "This Is England" reached a number 24 in the UK Singles Chart, Sheppard is quoted as saying: "I remember sitting in a different city watching it, thinking, 'There isn't a band'". The Clash finally split up shortly afterwards.

From 1986 to 1989 he collaborated with Gareth Sager (formerly of The Pop Group and Rip Rig + Panic) in Head, but their three albums made little impact. Sheppard next worked with Koozie Johns in Shot, which signed with I.R.S. Records in 1991, with Copeland as manager; the band's recordings were never released.

Sheppard moved to Perth, Australia in 1993, and has formed/played in two local bands, Heavy Smoker and the New Egyptian Kings with Shakir Pichler. Sheppard owns the Elroy clothing store on Beaufort Street in Mount Lawley. In July 2002, it was suggested that he would be guest guitarist on a Japanese tour with Koozie Johns' new band, Sinnerstar, but the tour was cancelled.

In 2007 Sheppard formed The DomNicks with Dom Mariani (The Stems, The Someloves, DM3), together with bass player Howard Shawcross (The Elks) and drummer Marz Frisina (The Chevelles). This combo play a mix of Mariani and Sheppard originals with a spread of 1960s and 1970s garage rock and soul material. In 2009 they released an EP, Hey Rock 'n' Roller, which was produced by Wayne Connolly (The Vines, You Am I).  The DomNicks toured with the Hoodoo Gurus and performed in Sydney and Melbourne at the Joe Strummer tribute concert, 'Revolution Rock'.

Notes

References

External links
 Artist Direct biography
 Sheppard playing with The Spics on YouTube

1960 births
English punk rock guitarists
Living people
Musicians from Bristol
People educated at Bristol Grammar School
The Clash members